Maryam Kavyani (born June 22, 1970) is an Iranian actress.

Biography 
Maryam Kavyani was born in Ahvaz to Baboli parents. She lives at present in Tehran. Ms Kavyani has a postgraduate degree in nursing and before entering into acting profession in 2002, worked as a professional nurse. In 2002 she played her first role in the feature film The Youthful Dream (Royā-ye Javāni), directed by Nāder Moghaddas. Since this time she has played in feature films Dexterous (Tar-dast), 2004, directed by Mohammad Ali Sadjadi, Spaghetti in Eight Minutes (Espāgeti dar Hasht Daghigheh), 2005, directed by Rāmbod Javān, Rival Wife (Havoo), 2005, directed by Alireza Dāvoudnejād, and Predicament (Makhmaseh), 2008, directed by Mohammad Ali Sadjadi. She became a national household name in Iran after appearing in the role of Raanā in the television series She Was An Angel (Ou Yek Fereshteh Bud), directed by Alireza Afkhami, which was broadcast in 2005. In recent years Ms Kavyani has been playing major roles in mainly television series, such as The Night Way (Rāh-e Shab), directed by Dāriush Farhang, The Times of Gharib (Ruzgār-e Gharib), directed by Kianoush Ayari, and The Fifth Sun (Panjomin Khorshid), directed by Alireza Afkhami. The latter, in which Ms Kavyani plays the role of Maryam, sister of Mohsen, is at present (August 2009) being broadcast by Channel 3 of IRIB.

References 
 Biography and photographs of Maryam Kavyani,  (in Persian).
 Maryam Kavyani, IranAct (in Persian).

External links

 
 A photograph of Ms Maryam Kavyani: Roma Fiction Fest (6-11 July 2009).  
 The page of The Fifth Sun at the official website of IRIB, Channel 3 (in Persian).

1970 births
Living people
Iranian nurses
People from Tehran
People from Ahvaz
Iranian film actresses
Iranian television actresses